Julia Morison  (born 1952) is a New Zealand artist working across a wide range of media including painting, sculpture, photography, installation and recently ceramics.

Education

Morison completed a Diploma in Graphic Design from Wellington Polytechnic School of Design, Massey University in 1972. She completed a Bachelor of Fine Arts with Honours from the University of Canterbury School of Fine Arts in 1975.

Career
Morison was awarded the Frances Hodgkins Fellowship in 1988 and undertook the Moët & Chandon contemporary art residency in Avize, France in 1990. After the year long residency she remained in France for ten years.

In 1999 Morison became Senior Lecturer in Painting at the University of Canterbury, a position she held until 2007.

Morison received a Laureate Award from the Arts Foundation of New Zealand in 2005.

A major survey exhibition on Morison's work, A loop around a loop: Julia Morison was organised by the Christchurch Art Gallery and the Dunedin Public Art Gallery in 2006, and curated by Felicity Milburn and Justin Paton.

In 2012 Morison was inducted into the Massey University College of Creative Arts' Hall of Fame. In the same year her exhibition Meet me on the other side showed at Christchurch Art Gallery and City Gallery Wellington.

In 2013 her public sculpture Tree Houses for Swamp Dwellers was installed in central Christchurch as part of the SCAPE public art project. A response to the devastating Christchurch earthquakes, the work is designed to be a permanent but relocatable feature of the city.

In the 2018 New Year Honours, Morison was appointed an Officer of the New Zealand Order of Merit, for services to visual arts.

Work

Morison's early work (from the time she finished art school) concentrated on 'severely formalist' paintings. After taking a break from exhibiting, in the mid 1980s Morison returned with a series of complex and ambitious works which became signatures in her career. Large multi-part works such as Vademecum  (1986) and Golem  (1987) are based on a system Morison created based on the number 10, referencing the Sefirothic Tree of Kabbalah and using ten 'logos' and ten key materials ('transparency', gold, silver, 'iridescence', lead, mercury or mercuric-oxide, clay, ash, blood, excrement), in various combinations. These systems continue to inform much of the artist's work. This system has informed a great many of her paintings and installation works, and she continues to work with replicating forms (like the Celtic knot) and organising principles (like Victorian myriorama).

In 1997 Morison collaborated with fashion designer Martin Grant on Material evidence: 100-headless woman , a series of ten dresses, each three metres high and each based on a specific material, such as gold, silver, lead, excrement, blood, pearl, and clay.

After the 2011 Christchurch earthquake Morison could not continue painting and instead began making sculptural works, using plaster, clay, the liquefaction sediment from the earthquake and found objects. Recently she has been working on a major new series of porcelain and stoneware ceramic head forms, called Headcases. She has currently produced about 30 works from an intended series of 100.

Collections
Morison's work in held in many New Zealand public gallery collections, including Christchurch Art Gallery, Auckland Art Gallery and the Museum of New Zealand Te Papa Tongarewa.

Reviews

Gina Irish, 'My Place: Julia Morison', Art New Zealand, no 109, Summer 2003–2004
John Hurrell, 'Morison Sculpture in Auckland', EyeContact, 29 November 2011
Creon Upton, 'Morison's Plaster Wall Sculptures', EyeContact, 22 September 2013
Andrew Paul Wood, 'Morison Tree Houses in Christchurch', EyeContact, 12 October 2013
Mark Amery, 'Short Shrift', The Big Idea, 8 October 2014
Allan Smith, 'Julia Morison's Headcases', EyeContact, 9 April 2015

References

Living people
1952 births
Ilam School of Fine Arts alumni
New Zealand painters
People from Pahiatua
New Zealand women painters
New Zealand ceramicists
New Zealand women ceramicists
New Zealand women sculptors
New Zealand sculptors
New Zealand photographers
New Zealand women photographers
Officers of the New Zealand Order of Merit